Klimovka is a rural locality (a selo) in Rogozovsky Selsoviet of Romnensky District, Amur Oblast, Russia. The population was 21 as of 2018. There are 2 streets.

Geography 
Klimovka is located on the left bank of the Belaya River, 64 km southwest of Romny (the district's administrative centre) by road. Voznesenovka is the nearest rural locality.

References 

Rural localities in Romnensky District